Cape Miseno (Italian: Capo Miseno, Latin: Misenum, Ancient Greek: Μισήνον) is the headland that marks the northwestern limit of the Gulf of Naples as well as the Bay of Pozzuoli in southern Italy. The cape is directly across from the island of Procida and is named for Misenus, a character in Virgil's  Aeneid.

History

Historically, the cape was important to the Romans since it was a natural shelter for  passage into the inner harbor of Portus Julius, the home port for the Roman western imperial fleet. In 39 BCE, Sextus Pompeius and the members of the Second Triumvirate — specifically, Mark Antony and Gaius Julius Caesar, the later Roman Emperor Augustus — signed the Pact of Misenum at the cape. Mythologically, important sections of the Aeneid play out in the Gulf of Naples:  This is where Aeneas' comrade, Misenus, master of the sea-horn — the conch-shell — made "the waves ring" with his music and challenged the sea-god Triton to musical battle. He was dashed into the sea and killed by "jealous Triton". Then:

"...Pious Aeneas 
sets up a mighty tomb above Misenus 
bearing his arms, a trumpet, and an oar; 
it stands beneath a lofty promontory, 
now known as Cape Misenus after him: 
it keeps a name that lasts through all the ages."

(trans. Allen Mandelbaum. The Aeneid. Bantam. 1981)

See also
 Capo Miseno Lighthouse

References

External links

 Servizio Fari Marina Militare

Miseno
Landforms of Campania
Campanian volcanic arc
Landforms of the Tyrrhenian Sea
Phlegraean Fields